The Warsaw W-Z Route (East-West Route) is a major thoroughfare  in Warsaw, Poland, that joins Praga in the east  with the city center, going through Muranów and out to Wola in the west. 

It was one of the first major post-World War II infrastructure projects, carried out during 1947-1949.

References

1949 establishments in Poland
Fast traffic roads in Warsaw